Boston Light is a lighthouse located on Little Brewster Island in outer Boston Harbor, Massachusetts. The first lighthouse to be built on the site dates back to 1716, and was the first lighthouse to be built in what is now the United States. The current lighthouse dates from 1783, is the second oldest working lighthouse in the United States (after Sandy Hook Lighthouse in New Jersey), and is the only lighthouse to still be actively staffed by the United States Coast Guard, being automated in 1998 though there is still a keeper acting as tour guide. The structure was designated a National Historic Landmark in 1964.

History 
The first keeper of Boston Light was George Worthylake, who drowned, along with his wife and daughter, when returning to the island in 1718. During the American Revolution, the original lighthouse was held by British forces and was attacked and burnt on two occasions by American forces. As the British forces withdrew in 1776, they blew up the tower and completely destroyed it. The lighthouse was eventually reconstructed in 1783, to the same  height as the original tower.

Historical information 

The first lighthouse established in America was on Little Brewster Island in Boston Harbor and was first lit September 14, 1716. A tonnage tax of 1 penny per ton on all vessels, except coasters, moving in or out of Boston Harbor, paid for maintaining the light.

The first keeper, George Worthylake, with a salary of £50 a year, also acted as pilot for vessels entering the harbor. In 1718 he and his wife and daughter, with two men, were drowned when the lighthouse boat capsized as they were returning to the island from Boston. Young Benjamin Franklin, then a printer in Boston, wrote a ballad about the incident entitled "Lighthouse Tragedy" and sold it on the streets of Boston.

The pay of Keeper John Hayes was raised to £70 in 1718 so that he would not be obliged to entertain mariners on the island for extra money which he found " prejudicial to himself as well as to the town of Boston." In 1719 he asked " That a great Gun may be placed on Said Island to answer Ships in a Fogg" and one was supplied that year on which the date 1700 was engraved. The gun is shown on a mezzotint engraving of Boston Light made by Burgess in 1729.

Hayes’ successor in 1734 was Robert Ball who petitioned the general court for preference in piloting vessels into the harbor. The court designated him as an "established pilot" of the harbor for the next three years. In 1751 the lighthouse was badly damaged by fire so that only the walls remained.

In 1774 the British took over the island and in 1775 the harbor was blocked and the lighthouse became useless. On July 20, 1775, a small detachment of American troops under Major Voss visited the island and burned the wooden parts of the lighthouse. The British began to repair it under a marine guard when General Washington dispatched Major Benjamin Tupper with 300 men in whaleboats on July 31, 1775, who defeated the guard and destroyed the repair work done. They were intercepted on leaving by British small boats and attacked. A direct hit on one of the British boats by an American field piece on Nantasket Head caused the British to retire to their boats with comparatively heavy losses. Only one American was killed. Major Tupper and his men were commended by General Washington.

When the British left Boston, March 17, 1776, a number of their ships remained in the harbor. On June 13, 1776, American soldiers landed on Long Island, Boston Harbor, and at Nantasket Hill and opened fire on this fleet who were soon at their mercy. Before sailing away, the British sent a boat ashore at Boston Light and left a time charge which blew up the lighthouse. The top of the old lighthouse was used to supply ladles for American cannon.

In 1783 the Massachusetts Legislature supplied £1,450 to erect a new lighthouse on the site of the old. Thomas Knox was appointed keeper.

On June 10, 1790, the Boston Light was ceded to the new Federal Government. In 1811, Jonathan Bruce became keeper. He and his wife witnessed the thrilling encounter between the American ship  and the British ship  on June 1, 1813, when Captain Lawrence, of the Chesapeake muttered the immortal words "Don’t give up the ship," as he was being lowered, mortally wounded, through the companionway. Nine minutes later, however, his crew was forced to surrender.

While Captain Tobias Cook of Cohasset was a keeper in 1844 a "Spanish" cigar factory was set up on the island, with young girls brought from Boston to work in it, in an effort to deceive Boston smokers that the cigars manufactured there were imported. This business was soon broken up, however, as a fraud.

On November 2, 1861, the square rigger Maritana, 991 tons, which had sailed from Liverpool 38 days earlier, with Captain Williams, ran into heavy seas in Massachusetts Bay and approached Boston in blinding snow, driven by a howling southeaster. At 1 o’clock in the morning of November 3, she sighted Boston Light and headed for it, but crashed on Shag Rocks soon after, with passengers and crew ordered into the weather chains after the crew had cut the masts away. The ship broke in two and Captain Williams was crushed to death, but seven persons floated to Shag Rocks atop the pilothouse, while five others swam to the ledge, as fragments of the wreckage started coming ashore on both sides of Little Brewster Island. A dory from the pilot boat rescued the survivors from the rocks. When the Fanny Pike went ashore on Shag Rocks in 1882, Keeper Thomas Bates rowed out and took the crew safely off the ledge.

Jennings brought the lighthouse dory to the shore, and, assisted by two naval reservists, pushed it over the ice and into the surf. Twenty-four men were clinging to the wreck in perilous positions when he reached it after a dangerous trip. Flinging a line aboard, they began the rescue of the half-frozen sailors, four times running the gauntlet of ice, rocks, and surf until all 24 men were saved. For this Jennings received a letter of commendation from Secretary Redfield.

During World War II the light was extinguished as a security measure but was again placed in operation on July 2, 1945.

Today 

Boston Light was automated in 1998, but is still staffed by resident Coast Guard keeper, Sally Snowman, who is assisted by Auxiliarist watchstanders from the Coast Guard Auxiliary. However, these personnel are mostly used to act as interpretive tour guides for visitors.

Although it is still an important navigation mark, its importance has been decreased over the last century by the use of Boston Harbor's North Channel for most large vessels entering the harbor, which is marked by Graves Light.

Guided tours of the island and lighthouse are available, by prior arrangement, with access on the ferry Columbia Point in the morning or afternoon, or by private boat in the middle of the day. They are also available through the National Park Service, twice daily on summer weekends.

The lighthouse underwent major renovations in 2014 and was covered with scaffolding. It reopened to visitors in 2015.

See also 
List of National Historic Landmarks in Boston
National Register of Historic Places listings in southern Boston, Massachusetts

References

External links 
Boston Light - United States Lighthouses
Little Brewster Island web page, with visitor information.

Lighthouses in Boston
Boston Harbor
Lighthouses completed in 1716
Lighthouses completed in 1783
Lighthouses on the National Register of Historic Places in Massachusetts
National Historic Landmark lighthouses
National Historic Landmarks in Boston
1716 establishments in Massachusetts
1783 establishments in Massachusetts
Towers completed in 1716
Towers completed in 1783
18th-century architecture in the United States
British colonial architecture in the United States
Colonial architecture in Massachusetts
National Register of Historic Places in Boston